Anton Richter (born 7 December 1911, date of death unknown) is an Austrian male former weightlifter, who competed in the featherweight class and represented Austria at international competitions. He won the silver medal at the 1937 World Weightlifting Championships in the 60 kg category. He participated at the 1936 Summer Olympics in the 60 kg event. He set one world record in the featherweight clean & jerk and one in the featherweight total.

References

External links
 

1911 births
Year of death missing
Austrian male weightlifters
World Weightlifting Championships medalists
Place of birth missing
Olympic weightlifters of Austria
Weightlifters at the 1936 Summer Olympics
Weightlifters at the 1948 Summer Olympics
World record setters in weightlifting
20th-century Austrian people